Irina Soldatova (Cyrillic:Ирина Солдатова; 1965 in Cheboksary, Chuvash Republic, USSR – 2002) was a female Russian archer. She was a Soviet Union national champion, and the 1985 World Champion.  In later life she became an archery coach, and following her early death both the sports school she attended and an annual national championship are named in her honour.

References

1965 births
2002 deaths
Russian female archers
World Archery Championships medalists